Habib Koité (born 1958 in Thiès, Senegal) is a Malian musician, singer, songwriter and griot based in Mali. His band, Bamada, was a supergroup of West African musicians, which included Kélétigui Diabaté on balafon.

Musical style 
Koité is known primarily for his unique approach to playing the guitar by tuning it on a pentatonic scale and playing on open strings as one would on a kamale n'goni. His music is also influenced by blues or flamenco which are two styles he learned under Khalilou Traore.

Koité's vocal style is intimate and relaxed, emphasizing calm, moody singing rather than operatic technical prowess. Members of Bamada play the following instruments: talking drum, guitar, bass, drum set, harmonica, violin, calabash, and balafon. Koité composes and arranges all songs, singing in English, French, and Bambara.

History 

Malian guitarist Habib Koité is one of Africa's most popular and recognized musicians.

Habib comes from a noble line of Khassonké griots, traditional troubadours who provide wit, wisdom and musical entertainment at social gatherings and special events. Habib grew up surrounded by seventeen brothers and sisters, and developed his unique guitar style accompanying his griot mother. He inherited his passion for music from his paternal grandfather who played the kamele n'goni, a traditional four-stringed instrument associated with hunters from the Wassolou region of Mali. "Nobody really taught me to sing or to play the guitar," explains Habib, "I watched my parents, and it washed off on me."

Habib was headed for a career as an engineer, but on the insistence of his uncle, who recognized Habib's musical talent, he enrolled at the National Institute of Arts (INA) in Bamako, Mali. In 1978, after only six months, he was made conductor of INA Star, the school's prestigious band. He studied music for four years, graduating at the top of his class in 1982. (In fact his talent was so impressive, that upon graduation, the INA hired him as a guitar teacher).

During his studies, Habib had the opportunity to perform and play with a series of recognized Malian artists, including Kélétigui Diabaté and Toumani Diabaté. He sang and played on Toumani Diabaté's 1991 release Shake the World (Sony), and Kélétigui Diabaté became later now a fulltime member of Habib's band.

Habib takes some unique approaches to playing the guitar. He tunes his instrument to the pentatonic scale and plays on open strings as one would on a kamale n'goni. At other times Habib plays music that sounds closer to the blue, style he studied under Khalilou Traoré a veteran of the legendary Afro-Cuban band Maravillas du Mali.

Unlike the griots, his singing style is restrained and intimate with varying cadenced rhythms and melodies.

Mali has rich and diverse musical traditions, which have many regional variations and styles that are particular to the local cultures. Habib is unique because he brings together different styles, creating a new pan-Malian approach that reflects his open-minded interest in all types of music. The predominant style played by Habib is based on the danssa, a popular rhythm from his native city of Keyes. He calls his version danssa doso, a Bambara term he coined that combines the name of the popular rhythm with the word for hunter's music (doso), one of Mali's most powerful and ancient musical traditions. “I put these two words together to symbolize the music of all ethnic groups in Mali. I'm curious about all the music in the world, but I make music from Mali. In my country, we have so many beautiful rhythms and melodies. Many villages and communities have their own kind of music. Usually, Malian musicians play only their own ethnic music, but me, I go everywhere. My job is to take all these traditions and to make something with them, to use them in my music.”

In 1988, Habib formed his own group, Bamada (a nickname for residents of Bamako that roughly translates "in the mouth of the crocodile"), with young Malian musicians who had been friends since childhood. In 1991, Habib won first prize at the Voxpole Festival in Perpignan, France, which earned him enough money to finance the production of two songs. One of those tracks, "Cigarette A Bana (The Cigarette is Finished)" was a hit throughout West Africa. After the release of another successful single entitled, "Nanalé (The Swallow),” Habib received the prestigious Radio France International (RFI) Discoveries prize. This award made it possible for the group to undertake their first tour outside of Africa during the summer of 1994.

In 1994, Habib met his current manager, Belgian Michel De Bock, director of the management and production company Contre-Jour. Working together, they recorded his first album Muso Ko. Upon its release the album quickly reached #2 in the European World Music Charts. From that point forward, Habib became a fixture on the European festival circuit and began to spread his infectious music and high energy shows around the world. Habib has played at most of Europe's major venues and festivals.

Habib's second album, Ma Ya, was released in Europe in 1998 to widespread acclaim. It spent an amazing three months at the top spot on the World Charts Europe. A subtle production which revealed a more acoustic, introspective side of Habib's music, Ma Ya was released in North America by Putumayo World Music in early 1999 and with sales over 100 000 units, worldwide, this success quickly helped establish Habib as one of world music's most exciting new figures.

The critical and commercial response to Ma Ya was tremendous. In 2001, Habib Koité and Bamada became one the few African artists to appear on Late Night with David Letterman one of America's most popular television variety shows,

Habib's artistry and powerful personality earned him some fans such as Jackson Browne and Bonnie Raitt, both of whom ended up visiting Habib in Mali. They have both done a great deal to support Habib's music, by promoting private events designed to attract new audiences and even performing live with Habib on stage. Habib and his band even made a guest appearance on Bonnie Raitt's 2002 album Silver Lining, in which Bonnie and Habib performed a duet on the co-written song “Back Around.”

Habib Koite & Bamada released their third album, Baro, in 2001. The recording was also a huge success, selling more than 100,000 copies worldwide and further expanding Habib's global audience.

One of the keys to Habib's success has been is dedication to touring. A true road warrior, Habib Koite & Bamada have performed nearly 1500 shows since 1994 and appeared on some of the world's most prestigious concert stages. Habib has also participated in a number of memorable theme tours alongside other artists.

In the spring 2000, he toured Europe as an invited guest with the legendary avant-garde jazz group, the Art Ensemble of Chicago. In the fall of 2000, Habib participated in the “Voices of Mali” tour with Oumou Sangare. In 2006 & 2007, Habib has also taken part in the Desert Blues project with fellow Malians Tartit and Afel Boucoum and Acoustic Africa tour with South African troubadour Vusi Mahlasela and the rising young star Dobet Gnahoré from the Ivory Coast.

Habib Koite & Bamada's transfixing performances have endeared them to an ever-growing audience, and in 2003 they released Fôly!, a double CD of live material.

Devoted fans have waited a long time for Habib to return to the recording studio.

In 2007 the band was on the road to present their new album "Afriki", a great combination of the Malian rhythmes, a meeting between tradition and more contemporary waves, with nice & intimate melodies. Recorded between Bamako, Brussels and Vermont (USA), this album is like a bridge between those 3 continents as well.

For 2008, new adventures for Habib and the Bamada; a mandinguo opera created in collaboration Mondomiw and with 2.500 enfants in the South of France who learned some songs written by Habib and presented in nice venues like the Palace of the Festival in Cannes. After the big success, they made it again the year after in 2009.

In 2010, a new version of the project Acoustic Africa was presented in Europe, USA & Africa, with Afel Bocoum (Mali) & Oliver Mtukudzi (Zimbabwe). A live CD & DVD were recorded during those tours

During the Fall 2011 & 2013, Habib participated to the Dutch project "5 Great Guitars" created by Jan Kuiper, with 2 periods of tour with more than 30 concerts each. In 2013, they were touring with 2 great Brasilian voices for a project called African Samba.

In 2012, Habib recorded in Bamako "Brothers in Bamako"; in collaboration with the US bluesman Eric Bibb, met in 1997, for the promotion of the Putumyao compilation "From Mali to Memphis". Since this time, they kept the idea to play again together … The duo has been joined by Malian percussionist Mama Kone for more than 120 dates in Europe and the USA since the release of the album. 

"Soô", released in 2014, was realized and recorded in Bamako with a new group of young musicians, composed of two brothers, Issa (guitar, banjo) and Mama Koné (percussion), Charly Coulibaly (keyboard) surrounded by Abdoul Wahab Berthé (bass, kamala n'goni) of the original group Bamada. 

After presenting this album in Europe and in the USA, Habib is happy to be back with Vusi Mahalasela for a new US Acoustic Africa tour in the spring of 2016. 

At the end of 2016, and the year 2017, Habib and his band continue to delight audiences in Europe (including a beautiful UK tour). 

In 2018, between a few tour periods with his band, Habib will be touring Europe with Bassekou Kouyate and Amy Sacko. Both the shared pleasure of playing together and the enthusiasm of the public pushed these two leaders to continue the adventure in the US in spring 2019. But ... it was not counting on the problems of visas more and more palpable even for musicians on the roads for many years. And, Bassekou & Amy did not get their visas in time. Habib has therefore proposed these dates in US duet with his percussionist Mama Kone, for an intimate formula that has attracted much interest from the public. The Koite - Kouyate project - however, was presented in Canada for a few dates, recorded entirely in Bamako at the Maya studio, with the complicity of some guests such as Toumani Diabaté, Amy Sacko, Sekou Bembeya Kouyate guitar maestro, M'Bouillé Koite (2017 RFi Award) and CT Koite, son of Habib who has written and performed a piece of the album.

The sound of the country, its rich and diversified musical traditions and its instruments (ngoni, flute, kora, doun doun ...) permeate the twelve titles that make up this superb project.

With more than 400,000 albums sold, more than 1,700 concerts around the world, Habib has built, step by step, an exemplary career, with always a foot firmly rooted in its culture.

Discography

Albums
 Muso Ko, 1995
 Ma Ya, 1998
 Baro, 2001
 Live!, 2004
 Afriki, 2007
 Acoustic Africa in Concert, 2011
 Brothers in Bamako, 2012
 Soô, 2014
Kharifa, 2019

Notable songs 
Foro Bana, a song that appeared in Koité's 1998 album Ma Ya, has been praised for its innovative guitar picking and melodious tunes.

Two tracks from Koite's 1995 album Muso ko, "I ka barra" and "Din din wo", were used in the Windows Vista sample music pack in 2007.

Sources 
Habib Koité Homepage
Artist Profile
Biography at Music-Wire

References

External links 
Review of Habib Koite and Bamada in Concert

Malian musicians
1958 births
Living people
Bambara-language singers
World music musicians
Senegalese musicians
Senegalese guitarists
Malian guitarists
People from Thiès
21st-century Malian people